Manitowish Waters is an unincorporated community located in the town of Manitowish Waters in Vilas County, Wisconsin. It has a post office with ZIP code 54545.

References

Unincorporated communities in Vilas County, Wisconsin
Unincorporated communities in Wisconsin